Hattikilla (Hatti:Elephant, Killa:Fort) (Nep:हात्तिकिल्ला) is a village in Shani-Arjun Municipality in Jhapa District of eastern Nepal.

History 

The village was named Hattikilla because it was mostly covered by jungle and many elephants lived there. As time went by people started to settle in Hattikilla and deforestation began.

Infrastructure 

Village facilities include roads, electricity, cable television and wireless communication. The village does not provide water service, schools, health centers, or recreation centers.

Economy 

Like most Nepalese villages, the main occupation is agriculture. Crops include mainly maize and paddy. People also grow various vegetables and cash crops such as mustard, sugarcane and tea. People also rear animals such as cows, buffaloes and goats. Few people are engaged in services. Many youths work abroad in countries such as Malaysia, Qatar, UAE, Kuwait and Saudi Arabia.

Rubber plants and pineapples are also grown there.

Once harvested, tea is processed there.

Climate 

This village experiences the subtropical monsoon. Summer is wet and hot, while winter and spring are dry and warm. The temperature ranges between 40 °C and 8 °C, averaging 20 °C-28 °C. Rainfall depends upon the clouds brought up by wind from the Bay Of Bengal.

References 

Populated places in Tehrathum District